Xanəgah (also, Khanaga and Khanagya) is a village and municipality in the Lerik Rayon of Azerbaijan.  It has a population of 909.

References 

Populated places in Lerik District